The City of Masters is a 1965 Soviet adventure film directed by Vladimir Bychkov.

Plot 
The film takes place in a city populated by cheerful workers who suddenly find themselves enslaved to strangers. But not for long. Together with the forest partisans, they began to fight for freedom...

Cast 
 Georgi Lapeto as Karakol'
 Marianna Vertinskaya as Veronika
 Lev Lemke as Duke de Malikorn
 Pavel Shpringfeld as Musharon
 Savely Kramarov as Klik-Klyak
 Yelizaveta Uvarova as Tafaro
 Roman Filippov
 Vasiliy Bychkov as Timolle (as Vasya Buchkov)
 Zinovy Gerdt as An artist
 Igor Yasulovich as Firen jr.

References

External links 
 

1965 films
1960s Russian-language films
Soviet fantasy adventure films
1960s fantasy adventure films
Films based on fairy tales